The 1st constituency of the Hautes-Alpes is a French legislative constituency in the Hautes-Alpes département.

Members elected

Election results

2022

 
 
 
 
 
|-
| colspan="8" bgcolor="#E9E9E9"|
|-

2017

2012

|- style="background-color:#E9E9E9;text-align:center;"
! colspan="2" rowspan="2" style="text-align:left;" | Candidate
! rowspan="2" colspan="2" style="text-align:left;" | Party
! colspan="2" | 1st round
! colspan="2" | 2nd round
|- style="background-color:#E9E9E9;text-align:center;"
! width="75" | Votes
! width="30" | %
! width="75" | Votes
! width="30" | %
|-
| style="background-color:" |
| style="text-align:left;" | Karine Berger
| style="text-align:left;" | Socialist Party
| PS
| 
| 29.92%
| 
| 54.71%
|-
| style="background-color:" |
| style="text-align:left;" | Jean Cointe
| style="text-align:left;" | Union for a Popular Movement
| UMP
| 
| 27.05%
| 
| 45.29%
|-
| style="background-color:" |
| style="text-align:left;" | Elodie Monier
| style="text-align:left;" | National Front
| FN
| 
| 14.69%
| colspan="2" style="text-align:left;" |
|-
| style="background-color:" |
| style="text-align:left;" | Guy Blanc
| style="text-align:left;" | Miscellaneous Left
| DVG
| 
| 10.73%
| colspan="2" style="text-align:left;" |
|-
| style="background-color:" |
| style="text-align:left;" | Jean-Claude Eyraud
| style="text-align:left;" | Left Front
| FG
| 
| 10.00%
| colspan="2" style="text-align:left;" |
|-
| style="background-color:" |
| style="text-align:left;" | Bernard Derbez
| style="text-align:left;" | The Greens
| VEC
| 
| 3.86%
| colspan="2" style="text-align:left;" |
|-
| style="background-color:" |
| style="text-align:left;" | Thierry Pajot
| style="text-align:left;" | 
| CEN
| 
| 1.85%
| colspan="2" style="text-align:left;" |
|-
| style="background-color:" |
| style="text-align:left;" | Danielle Fay
| style="text-align:left;" | Miscellaneous Right
| DVD
| 
| 0.78%
| colspan="2" style="text-align:left;" |
|-
| style="background-color:" |
| style="text-align:left;" | Guy Hadji
| style="text-align:left;" | Ecologist
| ECO
| 
| 0.45%
| colspan="2" style="text-align:left;" |
|-
| style="background-color:" |
| style="text-align:left;" | Jacques Daudon
| style="text-align:left;" | Other
| AUT
| 
| 0.36%
| colspan="2" style="text-align:left;" |
|-
| style="background-color:" |
| style="text-align:left;" | Fabrice Rosay
| style="text-align:left;" | Far Left
| EXG
| 
| 0.31%
| colspan="2" style="text-align:left;" |
|-
| colspan="8" style="background-color:#E9E9E9;"|
|- style="font-weight:bold"
| colspan="4" style="text-align:left;" | Total
| VALID VOTES
| 100%
| VALID VOTES
| 100%
|-
| colspan="8" style="background-color:#E9E9E9;"|
|-
| colspan="4" style="text-align:left;" | Registered voters
| 
| style="background-color:#E9E9E9;"|
| 
| style="background-color:#E9E9E9;"|
|-
| colspan="4" style="text-align:left;" | Blank/Void ballots
| 
| %
| 
| %
|-
| colspan="4" style="text-align:left;" | Turnout
| 
| %
| 
| %
|-
| colspan="4" style="text-align:left;" | Abstentions
| 
| %
| 
| %
|-
| colspan="8" style="background-color:#E9E9E9;"|
|- style="font-weight:bold"
| colspan="6" style="text-align:left;" | Result
| colspan="2" style="background-color:" | PS GAIN
|}

2007

|- style="background-color:#E9E9E9;text-align:center;"
! colspan="2" rowspan="2" style="text-align:left;" | Candidate
! rowspan="2" colspan="2" style="text-align:left;" | Party
! colspan="2" | 1st round
! colspan="2" | 2nd round
|- style="background-color:#E9E9E9;text-align:center;"
! width="75" | Votes
! width="30" | %
! width="75" | Votes
! width="30" | %
|-
| style="background-color:" |
| style="text-align:left;" | Henriette Martinez
| style="text-align:left;" | Union for a Popular Movement
| UMP
| 
| 39.81%
| 
| 51.77%
|-
| style="background-color:" |
| style="text-align:left;" | Karine Berger
| style="text-align:left;" | Socialist Party
| PS
| 
| 21.54%
| 
| 48.23%
|-
| style="background-color:" |
| style="text-align:left;" | Jean-Michel Arnaud
| style="text-align:left;" | Democratic Movement
| MoDem
| 
| 16.87%
| colspan="2" style="text-align:left;" |
|-
| style="background-color:" |
| style="text-align:left;" | Jean-Claude Eyraud
| style="text-align:left;" | Far Left
| EXG
| 
| 9.28%
| colspan="2" style="text-align:left;" |
|-
| style="background-color:" |
| style="text-align:left;" | Marie Tarbouriech
| style="text-align:left;" | The Greens
| VEC
| 
| 3.43%
| colspan="2" style="text-align:left;" |
|-
| style="background-color:" |
| style="text-align:left;" | Martine Lelievre
| style="text-align:left;" | National Front
| FN
| 
| 2.95%
| colspan="2" style="text-align:left;" |
|-
| style="background-color:" |
| style="text-align:left;" | Patrick Faure
| style="text-align:left;" | Hunting, Fishing, Nature, Traditions
| CPNT
| 
| 1.84%
| colspan="2" style="text-align:left;" |
|-
| style="background-color:" |
| style="text-align:left;" | Marcelle Schwendemann
| style="text-align:left;" | Ecologist
| ECO
| 
| 0.97%
| colspan="2" style="text-align:left;" |
|-
| style="background-color:" |
| style="text-align:left;" | Colette Faure
| style="text-align:left;" | Movement for France
| MPF
| 
| 0.92%
| colspan="2" style="text-align:left;" |
|-
| style="background-color:" |
| style="text-align:left;" | Elisabeth Thomas
| style="text-align:left;" | Far Left
| EXG
| 
| 0.83%
| colspan="2" style="text-align:left;" |
|-
| style="background-color:" |
| style="text-align:left;" | Brigitte Krief
| style="text-align:left;" | Divers
| DIV
| 
| 0.67%
| colspan="2" style="text-align:left;" |
|-
| style="background-color:" |
| style="text-align:left;" | Aurore Leforestier
| style="text-align:left;" | Far Right
| EXD
| 
| 0.38%
| colspan="2" style="text-align:left;" |
|-
| style="background-color:" |
| style="text-align:left;" | Denis Dupre
| style="text-align:left;" | Ecologist
| ECO
| 
| 0.36%
| colspan="2" style="text-align:left;" |
|-
| style="background-color:" |
| style="text-align:left;" | Jacques Daudon
| style="text-align:left;" | Divers
| DIV
| 
| 0.15%
| colspan="2" style="text-align:left;" |
|-
| colspan="8" style="background-color:#E9E9E9;"|
|- style="font-weight:bold"
| colspan="4" style="text-align:left;" | Total
| 
| 100%
| 
| 100%
|-
| colspan="8" style="background-color:#E9E9E9;"|
|-
| colspan="4" style="text-align:left;" | Registered voters
| 
| style="background-color:#E9E9E9;"|
| 
| style="background-color:#E9E9E9;"|
|-
| colspan="4" style="text-align:left;" | Blank/Void ballots
| 
| 2.01%
| 
| 4.05%
|-
| colspan="4" style="text-align:left;" | Turnout
| 
| 65.51%
| 
| 65.00%
|-
| colspan="4" style="text-align:left;" | Abstentions
| 
| 34.49%
| 
| 35.00%
|-
| colspan="8" style="background-color:#E9E9E9;"|
|- style="font-weight:bold"
| colspan="6" style="text-align:left;" | Result
| colspan="2" style="background-color:" | UMP HOLD
|}

2002

 
 
 
 
 
 
 
 
|-
| colspan="8" bgcolor="#E9E9E9"|
|-

1997

 
 
 
 
 
 
|-
| colspan="8" bgcolor="#E9E9E9"|
|-

References

Sources
 Official results of French elections from 1998: 

1
Politics of Provence-Alpes-Côte d'Azur